Donald Lauder Worland (8 June 1932 – 24 June 2021) was an Australian rules footballer who played with Geelong in the Victorian Football League (VFL).

From Winchelsea, Victoria, he is first cousins with John Worland, who also played for Geelong.

Notes

External links 

1932 births
2021 deaths
Australian rules footballers from Victoria (Australia)
Geelong Football Club players